The Royal Nova Scotia Historical Society is a historical society in Halifax, Nova Scotia that was founded in 1878 and is the second oldest in Canada (The Literary and Historical Society of Quebec is the first.) The Society is a voluntary organization that operates without an office or paid staff.  The Society first published the Nova Scotia Historical Quarterly and then the Nova Scotia Historical Review.  Eventually the publication was named the Collections of the Royal Nova Scotia Historical Society and now it is known as the Journal of the Royal Nova Scotia Historical Society.

Notable members 
George Elkana Morton
 Harry Piers
 Archibald MacMechan
 Thomas Beamish Akins

Historical Plaques 

 Treaty Day in Nova Scotia - Plaque of the Royal Nova Scotia Historical Society
 Nova Scotia Historical Society - 23 Plaques Created, 1911
Nova Scotia Historical Society - 9 Plaques Created, 1914

Collections of the Nova Scotia Historical Society 
 Article Index
 NS Historical Society 1879 Vol 1
 NS Historical Society 1881 Vol 2
 NS Historical Society 1882-83 Vol 3
 NS Historical Society 1884 Vol 4
 NS Historical Society 1886-87 Vol 5
 NS Historical Society 1888, Vol 6
 NS Historical Society 1889-91, Vol. 7
 NS Historical Society 1892-94, Vol.8
 NS Historical Society - Louisbourg 1894
 NS Historical Society 1895
 NS Historical Society 1896-98
 NS Historical Society 1899-1900, Vol. 11
 Collections of the Nova Scotia Historical Society, #12 (1905)
 Collections of the Nova Scotia Historical Society, vol. 13, 1908
 NS Historical Society 1910, Vol.14
 Index 1878-1910
 NS Historical Society 1911, Vol. 15
 NS Historical Society 1912
 NS Historical Society 1913
 NS Historical Society 1914
 NS Historical Society 1918, Vol.19
 NS Historical Society 1921, Vol.20
 NS Historical Society 1927, Vol.21
 The memorial sundial at Annapolis Royal: paper read before the Nova Scotia Historical Society, at Halifax, N.S. December the sixth, 1918 (1918)

See also 
 Nova Scotia Archives and Records Management
 Massachusetts Historical Society
 Maine Historical Society
 New Brunswick Historical Society

References 

 Royal Nova Scotia Historical Society
 Index of NS Historical Society articles
 
 Acadiensis on line

History of Nova Scotia
Military history of Nova Scotia